The Forest is a 1953 Soviet drama film directed by Semyon Timoshenko and Vladimir Vengerov.

Cast
 Yelizaveta Time 
 K. Trofimova   
 Vasiliy Merkurev  as Ivan Petrovich Vosmibratov  
 Konstantin Kalinis  
 Yuriy Tolubeev  
 Aleksandr Borisov 
 Georgi Kulbush 
 Konstantin Adashevsky

References

Bibliography 
 Rollberg, Peter. Historical Dictionary of Russian and Soviet Cinema. Scarecrow Press, 2008.

External links 
 

1953 drama films
1953 films
Soviet drama films
1950s Russian-language films
Films based on works by Alexander Ostrovsky
Soviet black-and-white films